Baramati  ([baːɾamət̪iː]) is a city, a tehsil and a municipal council in Pune district in the state of Maharashtra, India.  The city is about 100 KM (62 miles) southeast of the city of Pune and about 250 KM from Mumbai.

It has an average elevation of 538 meters (1765 feet).

Population

The population of Baramati as per the census of 2011 is 429,600.

Economy

Industries in Baramati vary from textile to dairy and food products. Similarly, there are many foreign companies in Baramati like Piaggio, Ferrero and Dynamix Dairy, Baramati. The oldest plant in Baramati MIDC is the Kalyani Steels. Likewise, recent additions to the list of industries are Bharat Forge, Ferrero Rocher, Bauli India and Barry Callebaut India.

Baramati and surrounding areas mostly depend on agriculture as the main source of income. The land in the region is moderately irrigated because of the Nira Left Canal irrigation from the Veer Dam. Nira River and Karha River also provide direct irrigation water to the farms.

Drinking water is also sourced from this canal. Additionally, Municipal Council also receives drinking water from Ujjani Dam through a pipeline.

Main crops include Sugarcane, Grapes, Jowar, Cotton and Wheat. Grapes and Sugar are exported from here. There is a huge marketplace for cotton and food grains in the city.

As the main crop of Baramati is sugarcane, there are three co-operative sugar factories viz.
1. The Someshwar Co-operative Sugar Factory, Someshwarnagar ,
2. Shri Chhatrapati Co-operative Sugar Factory, Bhavaninagar (Indapur) 3. The Malegaon Co-operative Sugar Factory, Malegaon.

Apart from agriculture, Baramati is home to a lot of industries which range from Steel Processing to Winemaking. 
Baramati is home to the three-wheeler plant of the Italian company Piaggio. The construction of a two-wheeler plant is completed, 150,000 Vespa scooters are produced annually with the initial investment.

Baramati uses 800 hectares of land as MIDC (Maharashtra Industrial Development Corporation) Industrial Area along Baramati-Bhigwan Road, 5 km outside the town's municipal limits. Baramati MIDC has several major companies like Bharat Forge Ltd, ISMT Limited, Imsofer, Senvion, Schreiber Dynamix Dairies Ltd., Piaggio Vehicles Private Limited, Godfrey Phillips etc. and is home of many small scale industries.

Baramati MIDC has a Baramati Hi-Tech Textile Park Ltd., set up over a sprawling 60-acres of land which houses small domestic garment manufacturers, consisting of a comprehensive group of textile oriented units specializing in functions such as garment-making, Apparel Printing & Packaging, Home Furnishing, Embroidery and Technical textile within the Textile Park. It also has a series of smaller units available as ancillary support units.

Baramati has an airstrip near MIDC.

Climate

Transport

Baramati is well connected by road with major cities in the State. It is 100 km from Pune by road. It connects to major highways via the road network. Baramati is also well connected by the rail network to Pune via Daund Junction. Baramati has two bus stands, with main bus stand located at the Indapur road. Baramati  bus depot provides buses to school children.

Baramati has an airport (Baramati Airport)  which currently hosts two Flying Schools.

Education
Baramati and the surrounding area hosts several colleges. Vidya Pratishthan offers courses from primary education to master's degrees. It is affiliated to Savitribai Phule Pune University, Pune MS India. Vidyanagari has a Law College, College of Engineering, School of Bio Technology, Institute of Information Technology, MBA, MCA apart from Primary School and Arts, Commerce, Science College. Tuljaram Chaturchand College (aka TC College) has a junior and a senior college. The senior college provides graduation in science, commerce and arts.

Government Industrial Training Institute in the Malegaon Bk. Industrial areas (MIDC) of Baramati,  Jejuri,  Bhigvan  & Kurkumbh is near Baramati City.

Agricultural Development Trust, Shardanagar offers dedicated college for girls. Courses in Shardanagar includes basic graduation, Junior College, Agri College, BCA, Home Science, B.Voc., Post graduation in Organic Chemistry, Microbiology, Psychology, M.Com., Nursing, Pharmaceutical Sciences, Pre- primary, Primary, Secondary School,  Bachelor's degree in Education etc.KVK is one of the Central Government Institute situated at Shardanagar, which provides agricultural facilities and demonstrations to farmers.

The Malegaon Sugar Factories's Shivnagar Vidya Prasarak Mandal, Malegaon offers a wide range of Technology and Management Courses.
The campus has an Engineering College, a Management Institute, a Pharmacy College and College of Commerce, Science & Computer Education.

Baramati also has one Technical High-school, R. N. Agarwal Technical high-school, which offers different technical courses like carpentry, wiring, welding, engineering drawing, computer science and many other courses which are useful to make one's engineering base strong enough at the school level and to make it more easier to understand engineering courses.

Government Medical College & General Hospital, Baramati is a medical college and affiliate hospital located in Baramati. It was founded in the year 2019. The Government Medical College, Baramati is affiliated to Maharashtra University of Health Sciences, Nashik. The college is recognized by the Medical Council of India for medical education in India.

The school celebrated its 100-year completion in 2011. The other renowned school in the town is the Shri Chhatrapati Shahu High school & Jr. College. Educationalist and social reformer, Padmbhushan Dr Karmveer Bhaurao Patil founded it in 1954 with boarding facilities as well.

The city hosts an agriculture development radio channel, the first of its type in India named Vasundhara Krishi Vahini (tunes on 90.4  MHz locally). This provides the farmers with reliable information on climate, plant nutrition, production seeds, fertilizers, market, new trends, etc. Another radio channel named "Sharada Krishi Vahini" (tunes on 90.8  MHz locally) hosted by Krishi Vigyan Kendra, Baramati launched in January 2011 for the same purpose.

Few kilometres away from Baramati, near to Malegaon Khurd, is home to the National Institute of Abiotic Stress Management (NIASM).

Hospitals 

 Silver Jubilee Sub District Hospital, Bhigwan Chowk, Baramati
 Government of Maharashtra, Rural Hospital, Rui, MIDC, Baramati
 Government Women Hospital, MIDC, Baramati
 Giriraj Hospital, Indapur Road, Near Bus Stand, Baramati
 Bhagyjay Hospital, Indapur Road, Near Marketyard, Baramati
 Krishna Drushti Eye Hospital, Near Bus Stand, Baramati
 Baramati Hospital, Behind Moropant Sabhagruh, Baramati
 Shripal Children's Hospita l, Near Panchayat Samiti, Bhigwan Road, Baramati
 Mehta Hospital, Near Virshaiv Mangal Karyalay, Bhigwan Road, Baramati

Places to visit

Shri Mayureshwar Mandir
Shri Mayureshwar Mandir or Shri Moreshwar Mandir also known as Morgaon Ganpati is a Hindu temple (mandir) dedicated to Lord Ganesha, the elephant-headed god of wisdom. It is located in Morgaon (Marathi: मोरगाव) Baramati in Pune District, about 35 km away from Baramati city. The temple is the starting and ending point of a pilgrimage of the eight revered Ganesha temples called Ashtavinayaka.

Babuji Naik Wada
In 1743, Babuji Naik built a magnificent fort on the banks of river Karha flowing through Baramati city. This fort is a glorious witness to the history from Bhimathadi to Baramati. With this in mind, the castle will be renovated. A museum will be set up in this palace and it will reveal the biography of Babuji Naik from 1743 to 1780. Tourists will also get to see the social, cultural and historical events from 1780 to 2014 and the historical stone inscriptions in Baramati taluka. The ramparts of the fort will be repaired and tourists will be able to walk on the ramparts. At the same time, the collapsed area of ​​the bastion, the town hall and the main entrance will be rebuilt.

Bhigwan Bird Sanctuary
 
Bhigwan is a small town 25 km from Baramati. It can be reached from Bhigwan by state transport bus from Baramati. Bhigwan bird sanctuary is 10 km away from Bhigwan town but it is difficult to reach by public transportation. There are two places with several type of migratory birds: Diksal and Kumbhargaon. There is a dam called Ujani. The backwater is spread in nearest parts of the villages. These birds can be found around this backwater area of Diksal. Diksal is 7 km away from Bhigwan. Small fishing boats can be hired for watching more birds. An outdoor activity where tourists look for pink flamingos and more at the Bhigwan bird sanctuary on a full-day tour from Pune. In addition to seeing a variety of India's bird species, visit the historic Bhuleshwar Temple along the way.

The Janvastu Sangrahalaya /Museum

The two-stored museum holds a collection of gifts received by eminent Indian politician, Sharad Pawar during his long career in public service. The museum also has a collection of photographs that chronicles the public life of Mr. Sharad Pawar.

Krishi Vigyan Kendra Baramati

Krishi Vigyan Kendra (Farmers Science center), Baramati was established on 1 August 1992 under the affiliation ICAR. From 1992 to 2008, the operational area of KVK was whole Pune district, but after the establishment of new KVK in the Pune district, the operational area is reduced to the 7 tehsils of Pune district. Krishi Vigyan Kendra, Baramati is Model, Hi-tech & National Award winning KVK of India working for farming community since 24 years for the development of sustainable agriculture.  The aim of Krishi Vigyan Kendra is to reduce the time lag between the technology transfer from research institutions to the farmers field for increasing production, productivity and income from the agriculture and allied sectors on a sustained basis.

KRUSHIK - Agri Technology Week 
The Krishi Vigyan Kendra, Baramati, Maharashtra organizes the “KRUSHIK - Agri Technology Week" every year at KVK Baramati after Diwali festival. It is a brainchild of Mr. Rajendra Pawar and Mrs. Sunanda Rajendra Pawar.

Shri Shirsai Mandir (Shirsuphal) 
Shri Shirsai Mandir is a Hindu temple dedicated to Goddess Shirsai. It is located in Shirsuphal, Baramati in Pune District, about 27.4 km from Baramati city in the Indian state of Maharashtra. There are many Monkeys in this temple as well as in this village Shirsuphal. This village is also called as "Monkeys Village".

Shri Janai Mandir (Katphal) 
Shri Janai Mandir is a Hindu temple dedicated to Goddess Janai. It is located in Katphal, Baramati in Pune District, about 7 km from Baramati city in the Indian state of Maharashtra.

Notable people

 Kavi Moropant
Kumar Patel

 Sharad Pawar
 Ajit Pawar
 Supriya Sule
 Sunanda Pawar

References

SVPM College of Engineering

 
Cities and towns in Pune district